Royal Air Maroc Express is a regional airline and 100% subsidiary of Royal Air Maroc based in Casablanca, Morocco. The carrier operates scheduled domestic services and scheduled regional flights to mainland Spain, the Canary Islands, Gibraltar and Portugal, as well as charter services for tour operators and corporate clients. The airline is based in Mohammed V International Airport.

History 
The airline began operations in July 2009. It is fully owned by Royal Air Maroc.

Destinations 
Royal Air Maroc Express serves the following destinations:

Fleet
 
The Royal Air Maroc Express fleet consists of the following aircraft (as of February 2020):

Incidents 
On 9 July 2018, Royal Air Maroc Express Flight 439, flying the third leg of a V-leg flight from Casablanca - Al Hoceima - Tangier and return, with near zero visibility, and 52 passengers and 5 crew on board, had a double impact with the ocean on approach to Al Hoceima when the pilots ignored company rules and performed multiple actions in direct violation of both aircraft and company procedures. This included deactivating the Ground Proximity Warning System (GPWS) and blatantly ignoring minimum height and visibility limits, with the result that the aircraft bounced off the surface of the sea twice on approach, about 1.4 nautical miles north of the airport, causing the pilot to declare a missed approach and to divert to an alternate airport at Nador International. The impacts resulted in severe damage to the landing gear and the lower body of the aircraft. No passengers or crew were harmed in the near crash and the aircraft was eventually repaired. The senior pilot initially lied to ATC about the reason for the missed approach as being a 'Bird Strike', and repeated this lie on his initial incident report, but after seeing the extent of the damage and hearing that salt deposits had been found inside the hull of the aircraft, realised this would not be believable and amended his report to state the truth about striking the water prior to the missed approach. (A bird strike carries no fault for the pilot, while an ocean strike does)
No information is known as to the disposition of the pilots of this flight.

References

External links

Official website

2009 establishments in Morocco
Airlines of Morocco
Airlines established in 2009
Companies based in Casablanca
Oneworld affiliate members